Cadetes de San Martín  is an Argentine football club, based in Mar Del Plata, Buenos Aires Province. The club currently plays at Liga Marplatense de Fútbol, the league where teams from General Pueyrredón Partido take part of.

Cadetes had a brief run on Torneo Argentino C although the team was soon relegated to lower divisions.

Titles
 Liga Marplatense: 2
 2003, 2009

External links
Official website 

Association football clubs established in 1939
Football clubs in Mar del Plata
1939 establishments in Argentina